Farm to Market Road 1750 (FM 1750) is a farm to market road located primarily in Taylor County, Texas.

Route description
FM 1750 begins at  SH 36; this intersection is actually located in Callahan County. The route travels to the west and quickly enters Taylor County, passing Potosi before turning north and into Abilene. It crosses the  Loop 322 freeway west of Abilene Regional Airport and passes to the west of Lytle Lake before ending at another intersection with SH 36.

History
FM 1750 was first designated on May 23, 1951; the original route was a section southward  from SH 36 in Abilene, but it was extended through Potosi and to another connection with SH 36 on December 17, 1952, adding . On June 27, 1995, the northern section between  FM 707 to SH 36 in Abilene was internally redesignated as Urban Road 1750 (UR 1750), but was redesignated back to FM 1750 on November 15, 2018.

Major intersections

References

1750
Abilene, Texas
Transportation in Callahan County, Texas
Transportation in Taylor County, Texas